The Ethiopian General Secondary Education Certificate Examination (EGSECE) is a nationwide exam in Ethiopia that is given to students after final year of secondary school education. Students take EGSECE usually for transferring to 11th grade or college in preparatory schools. The Ethiopian Secondary Education Certificate is awarded to students who pass the exam since 2001.

Overview
The Ethiopian General Secondary Education Certificate Examination is conducted annually for evaluation of competency in 10th grade and awards Ethiopian General Secondary Education Certificate for student who pass the exam. The award was started in 2001. Previously, the Ethiopian School Leaving Certificate (ESLC) awarded until 2003 before replaced by the Ethiopian Higher Education Entrance Examination (EHEEE). Students should submit three items before the exam as follows:

1) Transcript with internal scores from the high school. 

2) Ethiopian General Secondary Education Certificate (EGSEC, done after grade 10) 

3) Ethiopian University Entrance Examination (EUEE) results or Ethiopian Secondary School Leaving Examination

The second phase of secondary education leads to two field branch that students choose one of them: natural and social science branch. Fields in the Natural Science includes Biology, Chemistry, Mathematics, Physics, while Geography, Social Studies, history in the Social Science. The other general subjects are mandatory to both streams such as English, Physical Education and national and foreign language subjects.

References

Education in Ethiopia